Nantgarw (High Level) Halt railway station was a halt on the disused Pontypridd, Caerphilly & Newport Railway.

History and description
The halt opened in 1904. It was without raised platforms, having only ground-level wooden shelters which were sealed off from the tracks by wooden enclosures which were unlocked by the conductor when a train arrived. In 1924, it was renamed to avoid confusion with the similarly named halt on the former Cardiff Railway, Nantgarw (Low Level) Halt, which closed in 1931.

The signs at Nantgarw (High Level) Halt read simply 'Nantgarw' in its last years. The halt closed in 1956. Its location is no longer easily identifiable. The site is now part of the Nantgarw-Treforest cycle-way.

References

Railway stations in Great Britain opened in 1904
Railway stations in Great Britain closed in 1956
Former Great Western Railway stations
Disused railway stations in Rhondda Cynon Taf